Mikhail Sergeyi Markosov (born 29 June 1985) is an Armenian-Russian former football player who played as a striker.

Club career
Markosov has played for several Russian clubs in the Russian Second Division and Russian First Division. His professional career began in 2004 in FC Zhemchuzhina Budyonnovsk. He then moved to FC Kavkaztransgaz Ryzdvyany. In 2007, he made his debut in the Russian First Division in FC SKA Rostov-on-Don. Markosov began the 2008 season in FC Dynamo Stavropol. He was the top goalscorer in the 2008 Russian Second Division South Zone, scoring 27 goals, a feat no one in the entire Second Division surpassed. In the 2010 season, he played for FC Rotor Volgograd and came back to FC Dynamo Stavropol the next season. Scoring 10 goals in his first 10 matches for Dynamo, Markosov was transferred in the summer transfer window of the 2011-12 season to FC Ufa. From April until June 2019 Markosov played for FC Kuban Krasnodar, scored 7 goals in 11 matches.

International career
Markosov was called up to the Armenia national football team for a friendly match against Luxembourg on 5 February 2013 in Valence, France. However, he did not make an appearance for the team.

Personal life
Mikhail is married to his wife Nastya.

Honours

Club
FC Dynamo Stavropol
 Russian Second Division Zone South Top Goalscorer: 2008 (27 goals)

FC Khimki/FC Solyaris Moscow
 Russian Professional Football League Zone West Top Goalscorer and Best Player: 2015–16 (13 goals).

References

External links
 
 sports.ru
 
 sportbox.ru  
 
 fcufa.pro
 

1985 births
People from Budyonnovsk
Living people
Armenian footballers
Russian footballers
Association football forwards
Russian people of Armenian descent
FC SKA Rostov-on-Don players
FC Dynamo Stavropol players
FC Rotor Volgograd players
FC Ufa players
FC Sibir Novosibirsk players
FC Khimki players
FC Solyaris Moscow players
FC Dynamo Saint Petersburg players
FC Urozhay Krasnodar players
Sportspeople from Stavropol Krai